Yateem is a 1988 Indian action romance drama film directed by J. P. Dutta and released in 1988. The movie stars Sunny Deol, Farha Naaz, Kulbhushan Kharbanda, Danny Denzongpa and Amrish Puri.

Plot
Yateem revolves around a police officer Shiv Kumar Yadav (Kulbhushan Kharbanda), a widower, who adopts a bandit's son after killing the brigand in an encounter. The orphan is named Krishna (Sunny Deol) and while Yadav tries to raise him as his own son, Yadav's mother (Dina Pathak) never accepts him. Krishna is taunted by one and all for being a daku's son and he would have run away had it not been for the compassion shown by Gauri (Farah Naaz), Yadav's real daughter. Yadav sends Krishna to the police academy and by the time he returns as an inspector, Yadav had remarried. Yadav's much younger new wife Chanchal (Sujata Mehta) treats Gauri as the servant of the house and is also having an affair with Girivar Mathur (Danny Dengzongpa), the local police chief. Chanchal takes a liking to Krishna and sensing that the childhood friendship between him and Gauri might brew into something serious, tries to evoke brotherly love for Krishna within her stepdaughter but fails. Krishna is torn between his love for Gauri and his loyalty to Yadav but before he can take a call, he is posted to Fatehpur Sikri, the very place where his adopted father had killed his real father. Yadav is worried that Krishna might come face to face with Daku Purkhiya (Amrish Puri), the leader of his late father's gang, and learn the truth. Chanchal tries to entice Krishna but when he rejects her she gets him jailed for raping her. With Krishna out of the way, Chanchal then tries to get Gauri married off to Girivar.Krishna breaks out from jail to prevent this. He crashes the wedding and runs off with Gauri, hoping to prove his innocence.

Cast
 Sunny Deol as Inspector Krishna Kumar Yadav
 Farha Naaz as Gauri S. Yadav
 Kulbhushan Kharbanda as Inspector Shiv Kumar Yadav
 Danny Denzongpa as Girivar Prasad Mathur
 Sujata Mehta as Chanchal S. Yadav
 Dalip Tahil as Ujagar Singh
 Amrish Puri as Daku Purkhiya
 Beena Banerjee as Ujagar Singh's Wife
 Ram Mohan as Ramchander
 Asha Sharma as Parvati
 Vijayendra Ghatge as Senior Police Officer
 Dina Pathak as Shiv Kumar Yadav's Mother

Filming
The film was shot on-site at a haveli in the Badonikhurad Village of Datia, Madhya Pradesh.

Soundtrack
All songs are written by Hasan Kamal.

References

External links
 

1988 films
1980s Hindi-language films
Films scored by Laxmikant–Pyarelal
Films directed by J. P. Dutta